Kody Wakasa (born May 6, 1994) is an American former soccer player who previously played as a defender for FC Tucson in USL League One.

Career

College
Wakasa played five years of college soccer at California Polytechnic State University between 2012 and 2016. While at Cal Poly, Wakasa scored the game-winning overtime header against UC Santa Barbara in front of a crowd that was the 12th largest attendance in NCAA men’s soccer regular-season history. He also was with USL PDL side Ventura County Fusion during his time at Cal Poly, but never appeared for the club.

Professional
Wakasa signed with United Soccer League club Phoenix Rising on March 24, 2017. After playing two years at Phoenix Rising, he then joined FC Tucson in USL League One in 2019. Wakasa retired on July 2, 2020 in order to attend the Stritch School of Medicine at Loyola University Chicago.

References

External links

1994 births
Living people
American soccer players
Association football defenders
Cal Poly Mustangs men's soccer players
FC Tucson players
People from Hillsborough, California
Phoenix Rising FC players
Soccer players from California
Sportspeople from the San Francisco Bay Area
USL Championship players
Ventura County Fusion players
USL League One players
De Anza Force players